Lietutenant Justin Garrett Boyes, (February 6, 1983 - October 28, 2009) was a Canadian Army infantry officer. He was the 132nd Canadian soldier killed in Canadian operations in Afghanistan.

Personal life 
Boyes was born in Saskatoon, Saskachewan to Brian David Boyes and Angela Laurel (née Heagy) Boyes.

Boyes was involved with the Royal Canadian Air Cadets and graduated secondary school at Evan Hardy Collegiate. He was a member of his high school band and football team. He played Captain von Trapp in his school's rendition of the The Sound of Music.

Military Service 

On 4 January 2001, Boyes enlisted as a primary reservist to the North Saskatchewan Regiment (N Sask R) in Saskatoon. He paid for his studies in political studies at the University of Saskatchewan with the money he made as a reservist. He served his first tour in Afghanistan from 2004 to 2006. After returning from Afghanistan he completed his Bachelor of Arts degree in political science.

In 2007, Boyes transferred into the Regular Force. He completed his French second language training in Saint-Jean-sur-Richelieu, Quebec, and Officer training at Canadian Forces Base Gagetown, New Brunswick. That same year, Boyes was granted his Queen's Commission and was given the rank 2nd Lieutenant. In 2008, Boyes got his first posting in Edmonton, Alberta, with the 3rd Battalion, Princess Patricia's Canadian Light Infantry, as a platoon commander.

Boyes began his second tour in Afghanistan in October 2009. He was assigned to the Kandahar Provincial Reconstruction Team, where in the Police Operational Mentor and Liaison Team, under Maj. Scott Leblanc, he led a platoon mentoring Afghan National Police officers.

Death 

On 28 Oct 2009, Boyes was killed in an explosion, by IED, while leading a foot patrol 20 km southwest of Kandahar City in Panjwayi district. Two others were injured in the blast. The next day, over 2,500 troops assembled on the tarmac of Kandahar Airfield as Boyes' flag-draped coffin was carried onto a military transport plane bound for Canada. Boyes' commander stated that Boyes was one of his most trusted and professional officers.

Boyes was the 132nd Canadian soldier to die in Afghanistan since the mission began in 2002.

Prime Minister Stephen Harper, gave his condolences in a statement for the "commitment of Canadians like Lt. Boyes...their ultimate sacrifice will not be forgotten."

Boyes was known as an intuitive trailblazer with a dry sense of humour who never stopped learning.

Tributes 

 Boyes was featured in The Walrus, 2011, Portraits of the War.

External links 

1980 births
2009 deaths
Canadian military personnel killed in the War in Afghanistan (2001–2021)
Princess Patricia's Canadian Light Infantry officers